Tatar quarter, is a location where the most of Tatars in Balchik lives. Some people think is in Varna but actually is located in the town Balchik. Great artists like George Barbieri or Ecaterina Cristescu Delighioz did painted different of arst about the district (or street). Even there are streets in Balchik named Sevastopol ( "ul. Sevastopol") or Crimea ( "ul. Krim").

References 

Balchik